Events in the year 2011 in North Korea.

Incumbents
Premier: Choe Yong-rim 
Supreme Leader: Kim Jong-il (until 17.12.11), Kim Jong-un (starting 30.12.11)

Events

January
 January 6 - South Korea dismisses an offer of unconditional talks by North Korea, saying the offer was part of a propaganda campaign.

February
 February 9 – The first military talks with South Korea in months abruptly end with the North walking out.

December
 December 17 – Kim Jong-il died of a heart attack.

Deaths
 December 17 - Kim Jong-il

References

Further reading

 
Years of the 21st century in North Korea
North Korea
2010s in North Korea